A parsonage is a type of clergy house. The Parsonage may refer to:

Places
in the United States (by state)
The Parsonage (Winter Park, Florida), formerly listed on the National Register of Historic Places in Orange County, Florida
The Parsonage (Natick, Massachusetts), U.S. National Historic Landmark, home of Horatio Alger
The Parsonage (Oak Hill, New York), listed on the National Register of Historic Places

Musical group
The Parsonage (choir), a Scottish musical group